The Al-Bukhari Foundation Mosque is a mosque in Kuala Lumpur, Malaysia. It is adjacent to the Victoria Institution and opposite the Jalan Hang Tuah fire station and  Hang Tuah LRT station.

Transportation
The mosque is accessible within walking distance south west of Hang Tuah Station.

See also
 Islam in Malaysia
 GoogleMaps StreetView of Masjid Al-Bukhary, Kuala Lumpur.

References

Mosques in Kuala Lumpur
Mosque buildings with domes